Charles de Dompierre d'Hornoy (24 February 1816, Hornoy-le-Bourg – 21 March 1901, Paris) was a French admiral, politician and naval minister.

References

French Naval Ministers
French Navy admirals
1816 births
1901 deaths
Senators of Somme (department)